"Citysong" is a song performed by American alternative rock group Luscious Jackson, issued as the lead single from their debut studio album Natural Ingredients. It was commissioned as a double single with "Deep Shag" in some markets; and it contains a sample of "On and On" by Gladys Knight & the Pips. Co-written and co-produced by group members Jill Cunniff and Gabby Glaser, the song peaked at #39 on the Billboard rock chart in 1994.

On January 14, 1995, Luscious Jackson performed "Citysong" on Saturday Night Live.

Music video

The official music video for "Citysong" was directed by Tamra Davis.

Chart positions

References

External links
 
 

1994 songs
1994 singles
Grand Royal singles
Luscious Jackson songs
Music videos directed by Tamra Davis
Song recordings produced by Jill Cunniff
Songs written by Laurie Anderson
Songs written by Jill Cunniff
Songs written by Curtis Mayfield